Robalan was a champion New Zealand pacer Standardbred horse, known as "Robby". He is notable in that he won the 1974 NZ Trotting Cup, the richest harness race in New Zealand, and for his epic contests with champion pacer Young Quinn who he more than often beat and is particularly well remembered for being a free legged pacer.

He won the New Zealand Cup in 1974 over 3200 meters beating the hot favorite Young Quinn. He had the distinction of racing without hopples (free legged pacer) and was known for his phenomenal turn of speed.

He also won the prestigious sprint, the New Zealand Free For All three years in a row, breaking the world record in 1974 with a time of 2:26.6 for the 2000m mobile.

At the age of eight, in 1974, he was in a purple patch of form, winning six in a row. These efforts propelled him into being named Horse of the Year.

See also
 Harness racing in New Zealand

References

 Salute to trotting - Robalan

1967 racehorse births
New Zealand standardbred racehorses
New Zealand Trotting Cup winners